Kim Chizevsky-Nicholls (born April 23, 1968) is an American professional female bodybuilding champion, fitness, and figure competitor.

Early life and education
Kim Chizevsky-Nicholls (born Kim Chizevsky) was born in 1968 in Charleston, Illinois, the elder of two children. In 1970, the family moved and raised her in Decatur. While attending the E.J. Muffley Elementary School, she engaged in sports such as basketball, volleyball and cheerleading. While attending the Eisenhower High School, she was a multi-sport star there. In addition to participating in volleyball, basketball, and cheerleading, she ran the 100, 400, 800 relay, and mile relay, threw the shot and discus, and did the long jump. Upon graduation from high school in 1986, she then attended Southern Illinois University for three years, where she studied legal and medical secretarial services and worked as a paralegal with the law firm Baird, McCarthy and Rowden. While in college, she joined the dance squad and participated in aerobics.

Bodybuilding career

Amateur
In 1988, she began dating Chad Nicholls, a bodybuilder who directed her away from being a aerobics instructor and towards bodybuilding, along with becoming her coach and later husband. With the exception of the 1989 NPC Jr. Tri State and 1989 AAU Central USA, Chizevsky-Nicholls would place 1st in every amateur bodybuilding competition she attended.

Professional

1993-1995
In her 1993 pro debut, Chizevsky-Nicholls attended her first pro competition, the Ms. International, which she won. In November 1993, she attended her first Ms. Olympia, where she placed fifth. At the 1994 Ms. International, she would place fifth. In 1995, she placed second at the Ms. International and Ms. Olympia.

1996-1999
In 1996, Chizevsky-Nicholls would win the Ms. International and dethroned the Ms. International champion, Laura Creavalle. Also in 1996, she would unseat six-time Ms. Olympia defending champion, Lenda Murray. This was the first time a pro female bodybuilder would win both the Ms. International and Ms. Olympia in the same year. She would retain her Ms. Olympia title in 1997 against Lenda Murry, who retired afterwards. At the 1997 Ms. In 1998 and 1999, she would win both Ms. Olympia competitions.

Retirement
Chizevsky-Nicholls decided to retire from bodybuilding after winning the 1999 Ms. Olympia.

Legacy 
Kim Chizevsky-Nicholls is regarded as one of the greatest and most muscular female bodybuilders of all time. She was the first female bodybuilder to win both the Ms. International and Olympia in the same year in 1996. She ranks as the best female bodybuilder in the IFBB Pro Women's Bodybuilding Ranking List until October 22, 2000. In January 2008, Chizevsky was inducted into the IFBB Hall of Fame.

Competition history 
 1989 Tri-State Bodybuilding (Illinois) - 2nd (LHW)
 1989 AAU Illinois - 1st (Tall)
 1989 AAU Central USA - 2nd (Tall)
 1990 NPC Tri-State - 1st (HW)
 1990 AAU Southern Illinois - 1st (Tall)
 1990 AAU Illinois - 1st (Overall)
 1990 AAU Central USA - 1st (Overall)
 1991 NPC Continental USA - 1st (Overall)
 1991 MPC Midwest Grand Prix - 1st (Overall)
 1992 NPC Junior Nationals - 1st (HW and overall)
 1992 IFBB North American Championship - 1st (HW and overall)
 1993 IFBB Ms. International - 1st
 1993 IFBB Ms. Olympia - 5th
 1994 IFBB Ms. International - 5th
 1995 IFBB Ms. International - 2nd
 1995 IFBB Ms. Olympia - 2nd
 1996 IFBB Ms. International - 1st
 1996 IFBB Ms. Olympia - 1st
 1997 IFBB Ms. Olympia - 1st
 1998 IFBB Ms. Olympia - 1st
 1999 IFBB Ms. Olympia - 1st

Best statistics

 Biceps - 
 Chest - 
 Height - 
 On season weight:
  (1989 Tri-State Bodybuilding)
  (1992 Junior Nationals)
  (1992 North American Championship)
  (1997 Ms. Olympia)
  (1999 Ms. Olympia)
 Quads -

Fitness career
Chizevsky-Nicholls gave up much of her muscle gains and began competing in fitness competitions in 2001, but with only limited success.

Contest history 
 2001 IFBB Fitness International - 6th
 2002 Southwest Pro Fitness - 4th

Figure career
Five months after giving birth to her first son, Chizevsky-Nicholls began competing in figure, but again with only limited success.

Contest history 
 2003 IFBB Show of Strength Pro Championship - 9th
 2004 IFBB Show of Strength Pro Championship - 7th

Personal life
In May 1993, Kim Chizevsky-Nicholls married Chad Nicholls, a former bodybuilder, drug and nutrition guru and coach for his wife, along with professional bodybuilders Ronnie Coleman and Lenda Murray. They currently live in Springfield, Missouri and has had two children, Dominic and Morgan Nicholls.

Television appearance
In July 1995, Chizevsky-Nicholls appeared on Geraldo, along with Bill Dobbins, Lenda Murray, Debbie Muggli, Sharon Bruneau, Debbie Kruck, Sha-ri Pendleton, and Nikki Fuller.

The 2000 documentary Bodybuilders dealing with female bodybuilding and specifically concentrates on Ms. Olympia and the rapid changes that happened to the sport from 1980 to 2000, with Kim Chizevsky-Nicholls being featured and interviewed in the film.

Motion picture appearance
In 2000, Chizevsky-Nicholls appeared in The Cell, which starred Jennifer Lopez. According to director Tarsem Singh's DVD audio commentary, the character she played was originally listed in the script simply as "helper", so Tarsem asked the production designer what disturbs him. So, he replied that “Those women that work out,” so he added her. Tarsem was concerned the audience might think she was a man in drag, so they gave her prosthetic breasts.

Notes

External links

Official web site

| colspan = 3 align = center | Ms. Olympia 
|- 
| width = 30% align = center | Preceded by:Lenda Murray
| width = 40% align = center | First (1996)
| width = 30% align = center | Succeeded by:Herself
|- 
| width = 30% align = center | Preceded by:Herself
| width = 40% align = center | Second (1997)
| width = 30% align = center | Succeeded by:Herself
|- 
| width = 30% align = center | Preceded by:Herself
| width = 40% align = center | Third (1998)
| width = 30% align = center | Succeeded by:Herself
|- 
| width = 30% align = center | Preceded by:Herself
| width = 40% align = center | Fourth (1999)
| width = 30% align = center | Succeeded by:Juliette Bergmann

| colspan = 3 align = center | Ms. International 
|- 
| width = 30% align = center | Preceded by:Anja Schreiner
| width = 40% align = center | First (1993)
| width = 30% align = center | Succeeded by:Laura Creavalle
|- 
| width = 30% align = center | Preceded by:Laura Creavalle
| width = 40% align = center | Second (1996)
| width = 30% align = center | Succeeded by:Yolanda Hughes

1968 births
Actresses from Illinois
Actresses from Missouri
American female bodybuilders
American people of Russian descent
American people of Italian descent
Fitness and figure competitors
Living people
People from Carbondale, Illinois
People from Charleston, Illinois
Sportspeople from Decatur, Illinois
People from Jackson County, Illinois
People from Macon County, Illinois
Professional bodybuilders
Southern Illinois University alumni
Sportspeople from Missouri
Sportspeople from Springfield, Missouri
21st-century American women